Artomatic is a multi-week, multimedia arts ad hoc event held in the Greater Washington, D.C. area.

 F. Lennox Campello 2000
 Patricia Goslee 2002
 Frank Warren's PostSecret project began at Artomatic 2004
 Mark Jenkins 2004
 Michael Janis 2004
 Dana Ellyn 2004
 Amber Robles-Gordon 2007
 Robin Bell 2008
Ric Garcia in 2008, 2009 and 2012
 Joan Belmar 2009
 Nicolas F. Shi 2009
 Tim Tate 2000, 2002, 2004, 2008, 2009, 2012
 Erwin Timmers 2012
 Nate Lewis 2012
 Anne Cherubim 2015
 Sandra Perez-Ramos  2016
 Diane Tuckman 2016

Lists of American artists